The Meek is a fantasy webcomic written and drawn by Der-Shing Helmer.

The Meek may also refer to:
 People who display meekness
 People as a group referred to in Matthew 5:5 in the Beatitudes in the Christian bible

See also
Meek (disambiguation)
 Meeks, a surname